Lgov is a town in Kursk Oblast, Russia, located on both banks of the Seym River (Desna's tributary)  west of Kursk. Population:    26,000 (1972).

History
It was first mentioned in a chronicle in 1152 under the name of Olgov (a possessive adjective from an old Russian name Olg, or Oleg). Lgov was razed to the ground by the Mongols. In 1669, Lgov Monastery was founded on the spot of the former town, which would be closed down in 1764. The monastic sloboda was transformed into the town of Lgov in 1779. During World War II, Lgov was occupied by German troops from 27 October 1941 to 3 March 1943.

On September 18, 2022, the town was heavily damaged by a significant F2/T5 tornado. Over 200 structures were damaged or destroyed as a result of this strong wedge tornado. Many residential structures had roofs torn off, and some sustained collapse of their exterior walls, but most of these structures were poorly-built homes. Numerous trees were downed, and high-voltage power lines were also damaged or destroyed.

Administrative and municipal status
Within the framework of administrative divisions, Lgov serves as the administrative center of Lgovsky District, even though it is not a part of it. As an administrative division, it is incorporated separately as the town of oblast significance of Lgov—an administrative unit with the status equal to that of the districts. As a municipal division, the town of oblast significance of Lgov is incorporated as Lgov Urban Okrug.

Lgov Prison
Lgov Prison, a prison of the Federal Penitentiary Service, is located in Lgov.

Notable people
 Tetiana Andriienko (1938–2016), botanist, conservationist, and professor
 Nikolay Aseyev (1889—1963), poet 
 Boris Bukreev (1859–1962), mathematician
 Arkady Gaidar (1904—1941), writer
 Tamara Syomina (born 1938), film actress

References

Notes

Sources

External links
Unofficial website of Lgov 

Cities and towns in Kursk Oblast
Lgovsky Uyezd